Paek Sang-ho is a North Korean Colonel General.  He has been an alternate member to the Central Committee of the Workers' Party of Korea since 1993.  He served on the 10th Supreme People's Assembly, from 1998 to 2003. Paek gained the rank of Colonel General in 2002, in a ceremony held on Kim Jong-il's birthday.  Previously, he had been a Lieutenant General since 1992.

See also

Politics of North Korea

References
Yonhap News Agency.  "Who's who, North Korea," pp. 787–812 in

External links
KCNA report on the promotion of Kim and others, 2002

Living people
North Korean generals
Year of birth missing (living people)